José Roquez Pérez (born 19 March 1971) is a retired Cuban athlete who specialised in the 400 metres hurdles. He represented his country at two World Championships, in 1993 and 1995, reaching the semifinals on both occasion. In addition he won multiple medals on regional level.

His personal best in the event is 49.28 seconds set in Cali in 1993.

Competition record

References

All-Athletics profile

1971 births
Living people
Cuban male hurdlers
World Athletics Championships athletes for Cuba
Competitors at the 1994 Goodwill Games
20th-century Cuban people